The following is a timeline of the history of the city of Lviv, Ukraine.

Prior to 18th century

 1256 - Lviv mentioned in the Galician–Volhynian Chronicle.
 1272 - Leo I of Galicia relocates Galicia-Volhynia capital to Lviv from Halych (approximate date).
 1340 - Town taken by forces of Casimir III of Poland.
 1356 - City granted Magdeburg rights.
 1362 - High Castle rebuilt.
 1363 - Armenian church built.
 1365 - Roman Catholic Diocese of Lwów established.
 1370 - Latin Cathedral construction begins (approximate date).
 1387 - 27 September: Petru II of Moldavia paid homage to Polish King Władysław II Jagiełło and Queen Jadwiga of Poland making Moldavia a vassal principality of the Kingdom of Poland.
 1412 - Catholic see established.
 1434 - City becomes capital of the Polish Ruthenian Voivodeship.
 1480 - Latin Cathedral construction completed.
 1527 - .
 1550 - Church of St. Onuphrius built.
 1556 - Arsenal built.
 1580 - Korniakt Palace built on Market Square.
 1582 - Karaite synagogue built.
 1586 - Ukrainian Lviv Dormition Brotherhood established.
 1589 - Bandinelli Palace built on Market Square.
 1593 - Printing press in operation.
 1596 - Ukrainian Greek Catholic Church founded.

 1609 - Golden Rose Synagogue opens.
 1618 - Hlyniany Gate built.
 1626 - City becomes seat of Armenian bishopric.
 1629 - Dormition Church built.
 1630 - Bernardine Church and Monastery and Church of St. Mary Magdalene consecrated.
 1648 - City besieged by Cossacks.
 1655 - City besieged by Cossacks again.
 1656 - Lwów Oath.
 1661 - Jesuit Lviv University founded.
 1672 - Siege of Lviv by Turks.
 1675 - Battle of Lwów (1675).

18th–19th centuries

 1704 - City besieged by forces of Charles XII of Sweden.
 1762 - Greek Catholic St. George's Cathedral built.
 1772 - City annexed by Austria in the First Partition of Poland and made the capital of the newly formed Austrian Galicia under the Germanized name Lemberg.
 1776 - Population: 29,500.
 1784
 Secular University established.
 Brygidki prison in use.
 1787 - Lychakiv Cemetery established.
 1788 - Stauropegion Institute founded.
 1809 - 27 May-19 June: City taken by forces of Józef Poniatowski.
 1810 -  newspaper begins publication.
 1817 - Polish Ossolineum founded.
 1825 - German designated as official administrative language.
 1829 - Viennese Cafe in business.
 1835 - Town Hall and Ivan Franko Park gazebo built.
 1842 - Skarbek Theatre opens.
 1844 - Technical Academy established.
 1846 - Tempel Synagogue built.
 1848
 2 November: City "bombarded by the Austrians."
  newspaper begins publication.
 1850 - Chamber of Commerce founded.
 1853 
Ignacy Łukasiewicz invents kerosene lamp.
Street lighting installed.

 1863 -  built.
 1867 - Pravda newspaper begins publication.
 1868 - Prosvita society founded.
 1870
 City self-government in effect.
 Population: 87,105.
 1873 - Shevchenko Scientific Society founded.
 1877 - Industrial exhibition held.
 1878 - Government House built.
 1880 -  newspaper begins publication.
 1881
  founded.
 Galician Regional Diet building constructed.
 1883 -  newspaper begins publication.
 1890 - Population: 128,419.
 1892 - Lychakivskyi Park laid out.
 1894 -  held.
 1898
 Literaturno-naukovyi vistnyk literary-scientific journal begins publication.
 1900
 Grand Theatre built.
 Population: 159,618.

20th century

1900–1939

 1901 - Hotel George opens.
 1903
 Lechia Lwów founded as the oldest Polish football club.
 Czarni Lwów founded as the second oldest Polish football club.
 1904
 Railway station opens.
 Pogoń Lwów founded as the third oldest Polish football club.
 1905 - Lwow Ecclesiastical Museum established.
 1907 - Galician Music Society building constructed.
 1908
 12 April: Politician  assassinated.
  established.
 1909 - Industry and Crafts College built.

 1911 - Church of Sts. Olha and Elizabeth built.
 1914
 26 August-1 September: German-Russian conflict.
 September: Russian occupation begins.
 1915
 May: Austrians in power.
 3–22 June: German-Russian conflict.
 July: Russian occupation ends.
 1918
 1 November: City becomes capital of the Western Ukrainian People's Republic; Battle of Lemberg (1918) begins.
 21–23 November: Lwów pogrom (1918).
 November: Poles in power.
 1920 - July–September: Battle of Lwów (1920).
 1923 - City confirmed as part of Poland per Conference of Ambassadors.
 1924 - Polish Cemetery of the Defenders of Lwów established.
 1925 - Beis Aharon V'Yisrael Synagogue built.
 1929 - Members of the Lwów School of Mathematics, Stefan Banach and Hugo Steinhaus, establish Studia Mathematica journal.
 1930 - Area of city: 66 square kilometers.
 1936 
 April 14 - demonstration of unemployed people shot by Polish police. Killed 1 worker V. Kozak.
 April 16 - funeral of the killed worker Kozak, police fights against workers. 46 people killed.
 1937 - Academy of Foreign Trade in Lwów established.

World War II (1939–1945)

 1939
 12 September: German forces attack the city. Battle of Lwów (1939) begins.
 18 September: Soviet forces join the German siege of the city.
 22 September: End of the Battle of Lwów. Soviet occupation begins.
 September: Polish resistance movement established in the city.
 The Soviets carried out deportations of captured Polish POWs to the USSR, mostly to Starobilsk.
 October: Czerwony Sztandar Polish-language communist newspaper begins publication.
 November: City annexed into Soviet Ukraine, and made capital of the newly formed Lviv Oblast.
 1940
 General Michał Karaszewicz-Tokarzewski, leader of the Polish resistance, arrested by the NKVD.
 April–May: Many Polish defenders of the city murdered in the Katyn massacre by the Soviets.
 19–20 November: The Soviets sentenced 14 leaders of the local branch of the Union of Armed Struggle Polish resistance organization to death.
  branch and Ukrainian State Institute of Urban Planning branch organized.
 1941
 24 February: 13 leaders of the Union of Armed Struggle executed by the Soviets following their sentencing in November 1940.
 22–30 June: Battle of Lwów (1941).
 30 June: German occupation begins.
 June–July: Lviv pogroms (1941).
 July: Massacre of Lwów professors.
 26 July: Execution of pre-war Prime Minister of Poland Kazimierz Bartel by the Germans.
 1 August: City made capital of the newly formed District of Galicia within the General Government of occupied Poland.
 September: Janowska concentration camp begins operating.
 8 November: Lwów Ghetto is established.
 1942 - Local branch of the Żegota underground Polish resistance organization established to rescue Jews from the Holocaust.
 1944
 23–27 July: Polish Lwów Uprising against German occupation.
 27 July: German occupation ends; city re-occupied by the Soviet Union.
 December:  begins.
  established.
 1945 - City annexed from Poland by the Soviet Union, and renamed to Lviv.

1945–2000
 1945 – Lviv Bus Factory built.
 1952
 Lenin statue erected.
  monument and  built.
 1957 - Ukrzakhidproektrestavratsia Institute established.
 1958 - Polish People's Theatre established.
 1963
 Football Club Karpaty Lviv formed.
 Ukraina Stadium opens.
 1965 - Population: 496,000.
 1966 - Pharmacy Museum opens.
 1970
 Ukraïnskyi visnyk magazine begins publication.
 Population: 553,452.
 1979 - Population: 665,065.
 1985 - Population: 742,000.
 1987
 Lion Society formed.
 Levshan-zillia magazine begins publication.
 1989
 Dead Rooster musical group formed.
 Population: 786,903.
 1990
  festival begins.
  becomes mayor.
 Gazeta Lwowska Polish-language magazine begins publication.
 Russian Cultural Centre opens.
 Area of city: 90 square kilometers.
 1991
 City becomes part of independent Ukraine.
 Chervona Ruta (festival) of music held.
 Lviv Physics and Mathematics Lyceum founded.
 1992
 September: Chrysler Imperial rock opera performed.
 Ekspres newspaper begins publication.
 Austrian Library opens.
  begins broadcasting.
 1993 - Znesinnia Regional Landscape Park established.
 1994 - Vasyl Kuybida becomes mayor.
 1996 - Lviv Suburban railway station built.
 1998 - Old Town (Lviv) designated an UNESCO World Heritage Site.

21st century

 2001 - Population: 725,202.
 2002
 27 July: Air show disaster occurs near city.
 Ukrainian Catholic University established.
 2004 - Center for Urban History of East Central Europe founded.
 2006 - Andriy Sadovyi becomes mayor.

 2008 - Etnovyr folklore festival and Wiz-Art film festival begin.
 2009 - Pogoń Lwów football club re-established.
 2011 - Arena Lviv opens.
 2012 - June: Some UEFA Euro 2012 football games played in Lviv.
 2014
 January: 2014 Euromaidan regional state administration occupation.
 February: 2014 Ukrainian revolution.
 2018 - Population: 720,105 (estimate).
 2022 - Russian missile attack on the city.

See also
 History of Lviv
 Other names of Lviv (Lemberg, Lwów, etc.)
 List of mayors of Lviv

References

This article incorporates information from the Ukrainian Wikipedia, Polish Wikipedia, German Wikipedia, and Russian Wikipedia.

Bibliography

Published in the 19th century
 
 
 
 
 
 
 
 

Published in the 20th century
 
 
 
 
 
 
 
 
 
 
 
 
 

Published in 21st century

External links

 Europeana. Items related to Lviv, various dates.
 Digital Public Library of America. Items related to Lviv, various dates

Lviv
Years in Ukraine